Joseph Bienaimé Caventou (30 June 1795 – 5 May 1877) was a French pharmacist. He was a professor at the École de Pharmacie (School of Pharmacy) in Paris. He collaborated with Pierre-Joseph Pelletier in a Parisian laboratory located behind an apothecary. He was a pioneer in the use of mild solvents to isolate a number of active ingredients from plants, making a study of alkaloids from vegetables. Among their successes were the isolation of the following compounds:

Quinine sulfate later proved to be an important remedy for the disease malaria. Quinine is the active anti-malarial ingredient in the bark of cinchona tree.

Neither of the partners chose to patent their discovery of this compound, releasing it for everybody to use. In 1823 they discovered nitrogen in alkaloid compounds. Other compounds they discovered include colchicine and veratrine.

The crater Caventou on the Moon is named after him.

References

Further reading 
 

People from Saint-Omer
1795 births
1877 deaths
19th-century French chemists
French biochemists